"That's All" is a song by English rock band Genesis. It is a group composition and appears as the second track on their 1983 album Genesis. It was the album's second single after "Mama". On June 17, 1993, MCA Records re-issued and re-released the song as a CD and "HiQ" cassette single.

The U.S. single reached No. 6 in early 1984, making it their first Billboard Hot 100 Top 10 hit; it included "Second Home by the Sea" as the B-side. The UK single featured "Taking It All Too Hard" as the flipside, and reached No. 16. Also released was a 12-inch single that included a live version of "Firth of Fifth" from 1981.

As the band's first break into the Billboard Hot 100 Top 10, the song is included in Rock Song Index: The 7500 Most Important Songs for the Rock and Roll Era.

Background and recording
The song was intended as an attempt to write a simple pop song with a melody in the style of the Beatles. Phil Collins acknowledged in a subsequent interview that the song also features one of his attempts at a "Ringo Starr drum part".

The song begins with Tony Banks playing the main riff of the song on a Yamaha CP-70 electric grand piano. The other keyboards used on this song are a Sequential Circuits Prophet-10 for organ pads and a Synclavier II for the organ solo in the middle section. The coda lapses into a guitar solo played by Mike Rutherford, as the drum beat intensifies, before the song fades away.

Reception
Cash Box said that "a light production touch uses a bouncy piano and keyboard foundation and makes for a moving tune, though there’s no movement in the relationship described."

Music video
The video depicts the band as homeless men taking shelter outside a disused factory. They perform the song, eat soup, play cards, and keep warm around an open fire. It was the first time Genesis used director Jim Yukich, who would direct the majority of their next videos as well as many of Collins's solo videos.

Live performances
The song was played live during the Mama, Invisible Touch, We Can't Dance, and Calling All Stations (with Ray Wilson on vocals) Tours. The song was played only during the first few shows of the Calling All Stations tour, before being discarded.

A live version appears on the albums The Way We Walk, Volume One: The Shorts, and their DVD Genesis Live at Wembley Stadium, as well as their home video The Mama Tour. An instrumental jazz version of the song appears on the live album A Hot Night in Paris by The Phil Collins Big Band.

The first verse of the song is also part of the "Old Medley" featured on The Way We Walk, Volume Two: The Longs and The Way We Walk - Live in Concert.

A more stripped-down version of the song was brought back as part of an acoustic set for The Last Domino? tour.

Personnel 
 Phil Collins – drums, percussion, vocals
 Tony Banks – keyboards, electric grand piano, Hammond organ
 Mike Rutherford – guitars, bass

Chart performance

Weekly charts

Year-end charts

Other notable versions
Canadian country music group Doc Walker covered the song on their 2008 album Beautiful Life. It was released as the second single from the project and peaked at No. 68 on the Canadian Hot 100.

References

External links
Music Video at VH1 Classic
Music Video on YouTube

1983 singles
Genesis (band) songs
Doc Walker songs
Songs written by Tony Banks (musician)
Songs written by Phil Collins
Songs written by Mike Rutherford
Song recordings produced by Hugh Padgham
1983 songs
Atlantic Records singles
Virgin Records singles
MCA Records singles